GoTo Meeting (formerly GoToMeeting) is a web conferencing software by GoTo. It is an online meeting, desktop sharing, and video conferencing software package that enables the user to meet with other computer users, customers, clients, or colleagues via the Internet in real time. In late 2015, Citrix announced plans to spin off the GoTo Meeting business as a standalone subsidiary with a market value around $4 billion. In July 2016, Citrix and LogMeIn announced plans to merge the GoTo family of products.

Technology
GoTo Meeting is designed to broadcast the desktop view of a host computer to a group of computers connected to the host through the Internet. Transmissions are protected with high-security encryption and optional passwords. By combining a web-hosted subscription service with software installed on the host computer, transmissions can be passed through highly restrictive firewalls.

History
GoTo Meeting was developed in July 2004 using the remote access and screen sharing technology from GoToMyPC and GoTo Resolve (then GoToAssist; later GoTo Assist and RescueAssist) to allow web conferencing. The later release of GoTo Webinar in 2006 and GoTo Training in 2010 expanded GoTo Meeting capabilities to accommodate larger audiences.  In February 2017, GoTo Meeting became a product of LogMeIn as a result of a merger between LogMeIn and Citrix's GoTo business.

Editions and features
GoTo Meeting features include:
 Mobile apps for iPad, iPhone, and Android devices
 Encryption and authentication security provided by a Transport Layer Security (TLS) website with end-to-end 128-bit Advanced Encryption Standard (AES) encryption and optional passwords
 Specific application sharing for showing only selected programs with attendees
 Multi-monitor support for a client PC
 Meeting recording and playback for recording and saving meetings to a user desktop for later review
 Total audio package provides toll-based phone or conferencing via VoIP.
 GoTo Meeting hosts up to 250, with Enterprise tier allowing for 3,000 attendees.
 Video conferencing
 HIPAA compliance
 In-room solutions with GoTo Room and InRoom Link.

Awards
 2016 Best Productivity App 2016, Appy Awards
 2016 and 2017 Best Collaboration Solution, CODiE awards
 A leader in Gartner's Magic Quadrant

See also
 Comparison of web conferencing software
 Collaborative software

References

External links
 

Web conferencing
Communication software